The International Wooden Shoe Museum Eelde is a museum in Eelde, the Netherlands, for clogs, clog-making equipment and machinery. It has the largest collection of wooden footwear in the world.

History 
The collection had been put together by Eiso Wietzes (1916–1977) and Egbert Wietzes (1925–1988), two brothers, who were the last wooden shoe makers in Eelde. After their deaths, the collection was enlarged by the private collection of wooden shoes owned by H.P. Bongers, a teacher at the Technical College in Enschede. Besides wooden shoes, Bongers’ collection consisted of traditional and early industrial clog-making tools, from Western-Europe. In 2009 the museum acquired a large collection of French clogs.

Collection 
Among the museum's collection are:
 Over 2,200 different pairs of wooden shoes and footwear with wooden soles from 43 countries.
 Hundreds of pieces of clog-making equipment from seven European countries.
 Simple machinery dating from the 1920s, from the Netherlands, Germany and France.
 An extensive collection of international literature, including photographs.

The museum provides guided tours and thematic exhibitions are held regularly.

References

External links 
 Website International Wooden Shoe Museum Eelde , the Netherlands.

Folk museums in the Netherlands
Shoe museums
Museums in Drenthe
Articles containing video clips
Tynaarlo